Kevin Haugrud served as the acting United States Secretary of the Interior from the end of the Obama administration on January 20, 2017 until the swearing in of Ryan Zinke on March 1, 2017. Until becoming Acting Secretary, Haugrud was deputy solicitor of the Department of the Interior.

On December 13, 2016, President-elect Donald Trump picked Ryan Zinke as his nominee for the position of Interior Secretary.

References

Living people
Trump administration cabinet members
United States Department of the Interior officials
Year of birth missing (living people)